Foeke Booy (born 25 April 1962) is a Dutch football manager, executive, and former player. He serves as the technical manager of Cambuur.

Club career
Booy played for eight clubs in sixteen seasons. After hometown club Cambuur Leeuwarden, De Graafschap, PEC Zwolle and FC Groningen he opted for a Belgian adventure. He wore the shirt of Kortrijk, Club Brugge and Gent. During his time with Club Brugge, he won the national championship twice and the national cup. In 1994, he played for FC Utrecht. However, a serious knee injury made it almost impossible for Booy to continue to play football at the highest level.

Managerial career
At the age of 34 he therefore decided to focus on a future as a coach. He coached the B-juniors of FC Utrecht, he had Young FC Utrecht under his wing and was assistant to the coach of the A-selection for two years. In 2002, he became technical manager and coach of FC Utrecht.

Booy is the most successful coach in the history of FC Utrecht. In his first year as a coach his team challenged for a European place for a long period but finally ended eighth with 47 points. The climax of the season 2002–03 was the fact that FC Utrecht won the Amstel Cup at Feyenoord's expense. The club from Rotterdam had been beaten in its own stadium 4–1.

In his second year as coach he saw some important names disappear from his selection, but FC Utrecht won the Amstel Cup again and scored only one point less in the league than they did the year before. Last season, Booy obtained the third main trophy with the club: Ajax were beaten at their own stadium, 4–2 in the match for the Johan Cruijff Schaal, the traditional game before the start of the season between the national champions and the Cup winners.

On 18 December 2007, Booy was named as the Sparta Rotterdam coach after managing Al-Nassr in Saudi Arabia from summer 2007. He left Sparta at the end of the 2008–09 season to become director of football at FC Utrecht, where he was sacked in May 2012. In November 2012, he was appointed head coach of Cercle Brugge in Belgium. However, in April 2013 he was fired because of poor results.

On 23 June 2013, Booy was appointed as manager of newly promoted Eredivisie side Go Ahead Eagles. He was sacked on 22 March 2015.

On 24 November 2017, it was announced that he would be the new technical manager of Cambuur, returning to the club where he started his playing career in 1980.

Managerial statistics

Notes

Honours

Manager
Utrecht
KNVB Cup: 2002–03, 2003–04
Johan Cruyff Shield: 2004

References

External links
Booys signs for Sparta Rotterdam 

1964 births
Living people
Footballers from Leeuwarden
Association football forwards
Dutch footballers
SC Cambuur players
De Graafschap players
PEC Zwolle players
FC Groningen players
K.V. Kortrijk players
Club Brugge KV players
K.A.A. Gent players
FC Utrecht players
Dutch expatriate footballers
Expatriate footballers in Belgium
Dutch football managers
Dutch expatriate football managers
FC Utrecht managers
Al Nassr FC managers
Sparta Rotterdam managers
Cercle Brugge K.S.V. managers
Go Ahead Eagles managers
Eredivisie managers
Eredivisie players
Eerste Divisie players
Belgian Pro League players
Expatriate football managers in Saudi Arabia
Expatriate football managers in Belgium
Dutch expatriate sportspeople in Belgium
Dutch expatriate sportspeople in Saudi Arabia